Jeanne Amen (1863 – April 9, 1923) was a French painter.

Biography 
She was born Jeanne-Marie-Joséphine Moreau  in  Belleville-sur-Saône.
She was a student of Antoine Grivolas of Avignon.

Amen was an inspector in the  drawing schools of Paris, and the director of the journal Art et la Femme. Around 1896 she published a 150-page book of her views on art, titled l'art au point de vue feminin.

She was buried in cimetière des Batignolles April 11, 1923.

Collections
 musée des beaux-arts, Lyon, Allée fleurie ou Églantiers en fleurs
 Musée des Ursulines, Mâcon, Les lys et la mer, Salon of 1900
 Musée des beaux-arts de Rouen, Rouen, Fleurs
Centre national des arts plastiques, Paris
 Musée Paul-Dini, Villefranche-sur-Saône, Sur la terrasse, 1892. Huile sur toile

References 

1863 births
1923 deaths
19th-century French women artists
19th-century French painters
20th-century French women artists
20th-century French painters